Alfred Mitchell may refer to:

 Alf Mitchell (born 1941), Australian track and field athlete who competed in the javelin throw
 Alfred James Mitchell (1853–1928), New Zealand police superintendent
 Alfred R. Mitchell (1888–1972), American landscape painter